Leskea is a genus of mosses belonging to the family Leskeaceae.

The genus has cosmopolitan distribution.

There are 112 species, including:
 Leskea abietina (Hedw.) Mitt. 
 Leskea acidodon Mont. 
 Leskea polycarpa Ehrh. ex Hedw.

References

Hypnales
Moss genera